Samantha Helen Rowe (born 30 June 1978) was elected to the Western Australian Legislative Council as a Labor Party member for East Metropolitan region at the 2013 state election. She took her seat on 22 May 2013.

Prior to her election, Rowe was the executive officer of Labor Business Roundtable.

She is the sister of Cassie Rowe, who was elected to the Western Australian Legislative Assembly in March 2017.

References

1978 births
Living people
Members of the Western Australian Legislative Council
Place of birth missing (living people)
Australian Labor Party members of the Parliament of Western Australia
21st-century Australian politicians
21st-century Australian women politicians
Women members of the Western Australian Legislative Council